Cunard is an unincorporated community in Fayette County, West Virginia, United States.

The community was named for the proprietor of a local mine.

References

Unincorporated communities in Fayette County, West Virginia
Unincorporated communities in West Virginia
Coal towns in West Virginia